Abdoul Nassirou Omouroun (born 12 July 1987) is a Togolese footballer currently playing for AS Togo-Port.

External links
 

1987 births
Living people
Togolese footballers
Togo international footballers
Association football goalkeepers
21st-century Togolese people